"Have Blues Will Travel" may refer to:

 Have Blues Will Travel (album), a 1958 album by Wes Montgomery
 Have Blues Will Travel (song), a 1958 country song by Eddie Noack